Electoral district of South Melbourne was an electoral district of the Legislative Assembly in the British colony of Victoria (Australia).

Its area was defined by the Victoria Constitution Act as: "Bounded on the North by the Yarra Yarra River, from its Junction with the Saltwater River to Princes’ Bridge, on the East by the Road bearing Southeast to the Northern Angle of Section No. 46, St. Kilda, thence by Fitz Roy Street to the Sea Coast, thence by the Sea Coast to the Yarra Yarra River, and by the said River to its Junction with the Saltwater River, being the commencing Point."

South Melbourne was abolished by the Victorian Electoral Act, 1858. New districts of Emerald Hill and Sandridge were created.

Members for South Melbourne

 = by-election
 = resigned

External links
Electoral District of South Melbourne, 1855

References

Former electoral districts of Victoria (Australia)
1856 establishments in Australia
1859 disestablishments in Australia